Ivo was the inaugural Dean of Wells between 1140 and 1164.

References

Deans of Wells